The 2007–08 Ukrainian First League is the seventeenth since its establishment. There were 20 teams competing. Two teams were relegated from the Ukrainian Premier League 2006-07. Four teams were promoted from the Ukrainian Second League 2006-07.

Promotion and relegation

Promoted teams 
These four teams were promoted from Druha Liha at the start of the season:

Group A 
 FC Dnister Ovidiopil : Druha Liha champion (Debut)
 FC Prykarpattya Ivano-Frankivsk : Druha Liha runner-up (Debut)

Group B 
 FC Sevastopol : Druha Liha champion (Debut)
 FC Feniks-Illichovets Kalinine : Druha Liha runner-up (Debut)

Relegated teams 
Two teams were relegated from the Ukrainian Premier League 2006–07 season after finishing on the bottom of the competition:
 FC Illichivets Mariupol : 15th place (Returning after 10 seasons)
 FC Stal Alchevsk : 16th place (Returning after two seasons)

Renamed teams 
 On July 24, 2007 the team of "Fakel" changed its name to "Prykarpattia".

Teams

Stadia

Managers

Final standings

Top goalscorers

Post-season withdrawn teams 

On June 26, 2008 MFC Mykolaiv was withdrawn from competitions. On July 1, 2008 the club was announced about the official disbandment. Due to the public pressure and with help of Hryhoriy Surkis, it became possible to preserve the club in professional competitions. MFK Mykolaiv was admitted to the 2008-09 Ukrainian Second League instead of the third team of Dynamo, FC Dynamo-3 Kyiv.

References

See also 
Ukrainian Second League 2007-08
Ukrainian Premier League 2007-08

Ukrainian First League seasons
2007–08 in Ukrainian association football leagues
Ukra